Scott Turnbull (born 1981) is an English actor.

Early life
In 2006, Turnbull graduated from the Liverpool Institute for Performing Arts (LIPA).

Career

Television and film career
Turnbull first started his career in the last series of the BBC One children's television series Byker Grove in 2006. Later in 2007, he guest starred in "Better Off Dead", the forty-first episode of the twenty-third series of ITV police procedural series, The Bill. In 2008, he guest-starred in the short-lived ITV medical soap opera The Royal Today, as Liam Dooley. In 2013, he guest-starred as Paul in the BAFTA-nominated fantasy/supernatural CBBC television series Wolfblood.

Theatre career
In 2006, Turnbull made his professional theatre debut as Geordie in Ian Brown's stage adaption of Colin Teevan's How Many Miles To Basra? at the West Yorkshire Playhouse.

Turnbull played the role of the daughter in Selma Dimitrijevic's production of her play titled Gods Are Fallen and All Safety Gone, alongside Sean Campion who played the role of the mother, and presented by Grayscale.

Filmography

References

External links

1981 births
Living people
People from Middlesbrough
Actors from Yorkshire
Alumni of the Liverpool Institute for Performing Arts
English male television actors